The 2015 New Mexico State Aggies football team represented New Mexico State University in the 2015 NCAA Division I FBS football season. They were led by third–year head coach Doug Martin and played their home games at Aggie Memorial Stadium in Las Cruces, New Mexico. The Aggies were football–only members of the Sun Belt Conference. They finished the season 3–9 and 3–5 in Sun Belt play to finish in a five way tie for fifth place.

Schedule
New Mexico State announced their 2015 football schedule on February 27, 2015. The 2015 schedule consists of five home and seven away games in the regular season. The Aggies will host Sun Belt foes Arkansas State, Georgia State, Idaho, and Troy, and will travel to Georgia Southern, Louisiana–Lafayette, Louisiana–Monroe, and Texas State.

Schedule source:

Game summaries

at Florida

Georgia State

UTEP

at New Mexico

at Ole Miss

at Georgia Southern

Troy

Idaho

at Texas State

at Louisiana–Lafayette

Arkansas State

at Louisiana–Monroe

Roster

References

New Mexico State
New Mexico State Aggies football seasons
New Mexico State Aggies football